Dichagyris celebrata is a moth of the family Noctuidae. It is found in Armenia, Turkey, Russia, Turkmenistan, Afghanistan and Iran.

The larvae feed on various herbaceous plants.

References 

 Michael Fibiger: Noctuidae Europaeae Volume 1, Entomological Press, Søro 1990,

External links
 Lepiforum e. V.
 www.nic.funet.fi 
 Fauna Europaea

celebrata
Moths of Europe
Moths of Asia
Moths described in 1897